The Nativity of Our Lady Cathedral is a religious building of the Catholic Church which is located in Bang Nok Khwaek, in the district of Bang Khonthi, province of Samut Songkhram in the central part of the Asian country of Thailand.

Its construction took six years and was built through the efforts of a French missionary in 1890, and for this reason its architecture is in the French Gothic style. It suffered some damage during World War II, but it was repaired shortly after. The cathedral was last renovated in 1994.

The cathedral follows the Roman or Latin rite and serves as the seat of the Diocese of Ratchaburi, which is a suffragan of the Archdiocese of Bangkok and was raised to its current status in 1965 by bull "Qui in fastigio" by Pope Paul VI.

It is under the pastoral responsibility of the Bishop John Bosco Panya Kritcharoen.

Gallery

See also
Roman Catholicism in Thailand
Nativity of Our Lady

References

Roman Catholic cathedrals in Thailand
Roman Catholic churches completed in 1890
Buildings and structures in Samut Songkhram province
Gothic Revival church buildings in Thailand
19th-century Roman Catholic church buildings in Thailand